REPowerEU is a European Commission proposal to end reliance on Russian fossil fuels before 2030 in response to the 2022 Russian invasion of Ukraine.

See also 
 Stop Bloody Energy

References 

Reactions to the 2022 Russian invasion of Ukraine
European Commission projects
Fossil fuels in Russia